Tan Sri Abu Zahar bin Dato' Nika Ujang (born 1 February 1944) is a Malaysian politician who has served as the Chairman of the Advisory Board of Malaysian Anti-Corruption Commission (MACC) under Chief Commissioner Azam Baki since May 2020. He was also the President of the Dewan Negara from April 2010 to April 2016 for six years and Member of Parliament (MP) for Kuala Pilah from April 1995 to November 1999 for a term.

Abu Zahar served in the State Assembly of Negeri Sembilan from 1986 to 1995, before being a member of federal Parliament from 1995 to 1999. After retiring, he became president of the Council of Former Elected Representatives (Mubarak).

He was sworn in as President of the Senate on 26 April 2010.

Election results

Honours

Honours of Malaysia
  :
  Member of the Order of the Defender of the Realm (AMN) (1992)
  Commander of the Order of Loyalty to the Crown of Malaysia (PSM) – Tan Sri (2007)
  :
  Knight Companion of the Order of Loyalty to Negeri Sembilan (DSNS) – Dato' (1996)
  Principal Grand Knight of the Order of Loyalty to Negeri Sembilan (SUNS) – Dato' Seri Utama (2013)

References

Living people
People from Negeri Sembilan
Members of the Negeri Sembilan State Legislative Assembly
Malaysian people of Minangkabau descent
Members of the Dewan Negara
Members of the Dewan Rakyat
Presidents of the Dewan Negara
Malaysian people of Malay descent
Malaysian Muslims
United Malays National Organisation politicians
20th-century Malaysian lawyers
Members of Lincoln's Inn
Commanders of the Order of Loyalty to the Crown of Malaysia
Members of the Order of the Defender of the Realm
1944 births